Labeo lividus is a species of freshwater fish belonging to the genus Labeo. It is found in the lower Congo River. It is sometimes considered conspecific with Labeo barbatus.

References

lividus
Fish described in 1976